Hunts Grove is a new build suburb, situated near the villages of Hardwicke and Haresfield, on the southern edge of the city of Gloucester. Building began in 2010 and the estate is as yet unfinished. The development was named Hunts Grove after the small woodland, Hunts Grove, on the site.

Planning 

Planning permission was granted in 2008 by Stroud District Council, the relevant planning authority. Gloucester City Council formally objected but a government planning inspector confirmed the permission in 2009. Further objections were raised when Stroud District Council proposed an extension to include a further 750 new homes.

On 25 May 2014, Gloucestershire County Council announced that a new primary school in the suburb which will serve the 1,750 new homes being built.

Hunts Grove Residents Association (HGRA) 
Hunts Grove Residents Association  (HGRA) is a voluntary organisation that aims to protect and promote the collective interests of the residents to ensure that Hunts Grove remains a unique and special place to live during construction up to 2033 and the years beyond.

This is achieved by working with the master developer (Crest Nicholson Strategic Projects), Parish, District and County Councils to ensure that residents needs and concerns in respect of construction, planning applications, management company, services, roads, public transport, parking and public open spaces are respected.

All residents are encouraged to get involved with the residents association to shape the community.

Residents Group 
On 5 May 2017, Hunts Grove residents formed a residents group to gather and represent the interests of its members. As of August 2018, Hunts Grove comprises more than 430 homes and the residents group comprises 392 verified members on its Facebook group page.

Members of the group must be resident of Hunts Grove, in the process of moving to Hunts Grove or representing stakeholders delivering services to the community.

On 24 August 2018, the residents group became a social media group page for HGRA (Hunts Grove Residents Association).

Group Description captured 2 September 2017:

"The Hunts Grove Facebook Group is established as a community resource by, and solely for, residents of Hunts Grove, Hardwicke, Gloucestershire, UK. 
The group is a "closed group", meaning that it is not open to public membership. Membership is managed strictly from the following: 
- Confirmed current residents; 
- Prospective residents; and, 
- Service providers and project stakeholders: (utilities, local government, developers, housing associations).
The purpose of the Hunts Grove Facebook Group is to provide an engaging forum to share information regarding the new development of Hunts Grove and encourage discussion on issues involving residents and the community as a whole. Members are asked to read our House Rules (see files folder) in order to maintain a safe, happy and spam-free group.
A moderation team monitors the group in order to ensure compliance with the House Rules. The current moderation team comprises Mark Andrew Ryder, Darren Morris, Amanda Dearlove, Demelza Turner-Wilkes and Iain Ledgerwood. 
Primary goal of this group is communication. 
Prior to this group, residents were not organised in any way to be informed and consulted on local decisions that will have a major impact on the village being built at Hunts Grove.
Secondary goal is to organise. 
Hunts Grove will need a residents association sooner or later. So this group can be a forum for interested people to come forward to volunteer and ensure the support of residents as a whole. 
Issues such as build progress, roads, housing, broadband, schools, GP surgery and even the planned pub! Discuss it all here along with any local interests, issues or requests.

Phases and Developers 

 PHASE 1 (Complete)
 Crest Nicholson - Development name "Whitstone Hundred"
 David Wilson Homes - Development name "Haresfield Chase"

 PHASE 2 (In Progress)
 Crest Nicholson - Development name "Hunts Grove Gate"
 Crest Nicholson - Development name "The Ridings"
 David Wilson Homes - Development name "Rosewood Grange"
 Bellway Homes - Development name "Springfields"

 PHASE 3 (In Progress)
 Bovis Homes - Development name "Oaklands"
 Linden Homes (In planning as at September 2020)
 Colethrop Farm Limited (In planning as at September 2020)
 PHASE 4 (Not Started)
 Crest Nicholson - (In planning as at September 2020)

Hunts Grove Primary Academy 
Hunts Grove Primary Academy is operated by Robinswood Academy Trust and opened in September 2019. Construction of the school was contracted by Crest Nicholson to Willmott Dixon Construction Ltd with the build commencing September 3rd, 2018.

Location

Hunts Grove is being built on land formerly part of Colethrop Farm in the parishes of Hardwicke and Haresfield, Stroud district. On 1 April 2020 it became a parish in its own right.

References 

Areas of Gloucester
Civil parishes in Gloucestershire
Stroud District